James E. Tolman (November 8, 1867 – February 21, 1956) was an American lawyer, and politician who served as the mayor of Gloucester, Massachusetts, and as a member of the Massachusetts House of Representatives.

Early life and education
Tolman was born on November 8, 1867, in Gloucester, Massachusetts. He attended Gloucester public schools and in 1909 graduated from Boston University School of Law.

Business career
Tolman was admitted to the Massachusetts Bar in 1910. For fifteen years, he worked in the theatre business as part of the partnership of Lothrop and Tolman. Tolman also worked in the grocery and provision business.

Political career

Gloucester, Massachusetts Common Council
From 1899 to 1901 Tolman served on the Gloucester, Massachusetts Common Council. For two years, in 1899 and in 1901, Tolman was the President of the Common Council.

Mayor of Gloucester
In 1902 Tolman ran as an Independent Republican  Gloucester mayoral election.  On December 2, 1902 Tolman was elected as the mayor of Gloucester.

Massachusetts House of Representatives
Tolman served as a Republican member of the Massachusetts House representing the Twenty Second Essex District in 1909, and again from 1914  to 1916.  From 1917 to 1918 Tolman represented the Twenty First Essex District in the House.

In the 1909 House Tolman served as the Clerk of the Committee on Public Lighting. In the 1914 House Tolman served on the Committee on Legal Affairs and on the Committee on Public Lighting.  In the 1915 House Tolman served as the Chairman of the Committee on Public Lighting.
In the 1916 House Tolman served on the Committee on legal affairs and as the Chairman of the Committee on public lighting.

Massachusetts Senate
From 1910 to 1912, Tolman represented the Third Essex District in the Massachusetts State Senate 
In the 1910 Senate Tolman served as the Chairman of the Committee of Third Reading, and on the Committees on Legal Affairs, Mercantile Affairs and Constitutional Amendments.  In the 1911 Senate Tolman served as the Chairman of the Committees on Legal Affairs and of Public Lighting, and on the Committee on Mercantile Affairs.

Death
Tolman died on February 21, 1956, at his home in Gloucester. He was 88 years old.

See also
 1910 Massachusetts legislature
 1915 Massachusetts legislature
 1916 Massachusetts legislature
 1917 Massachusetts legislature
 1918 Massachusetts legislature

References

1867 births
1956 deaths
Boston University School of Law alumni
Republican Party members of the Massachusetts House of Representatives
Republican Party Massachusetts state senators
Massachusetts city council members
Massachusetts lawyers
Mayors of Gloucester, Massachusetts
People from Gloucester, Massachusetts